Charles Buaku Atsina Junior is a Ghanaian-Italian professional football player currently playing for Uerdingen 05 in the Oberliga Niederrhein.

Career
Born on 24 March 1989, he grew up in Italy where he started his football academy in Verona. 2012 he joined the Spanish liga2 AD Alcorcon.

In 2013, he moved to VfL Bochum II.

In 2015, he joined Tus Ennepetal and became the only player to score five goals in a game during the first round of the German Kreispokal. On 28 July 2013, he became the first Ghanaian and Italian footballer to score eight goals in 60 minutes during a tournament of Rodemann cup in Bochum, Germany. His team beat DJK Adler Dahlhausen 1923 e.V. 13–1 in the Rodemann Cup.

On 14 October 2017, he signed a contract with Albanian club Vllanzia brought in by manager Armando Cungu.

In August 2019, he signed a contract with Maltese Premier League club Hibernians F.C.

In August 2021, he returned to Germany to play for Uerdingen 05.

References

External links

1989 births
Living people
Ghanaian footballers
Association football forwards
People from Sekondi-Takoradi
Ghanaian emigrants to Italy
Naturalised citizens of Italy
Italian sportspeople of African descent
AD Alcorcón footballers
VfL Bochum II players
Käpylän Pallo players
FK Panevėžys players
KF Vllaznia Shkodër players
KS Kastrioti players
Hibernians F.C. players
KFC Uerdingen 05 players
Kategoria Superiore players
Kakkonen players
Maltese Premier League players
Regionalliga players
Oberliga (football) players
Ghanaian expatriate footballers
Expatriate footballers in Spain
Expatriate footballers in Lithuania
Expatriate footballers in Germany
Expatriate footballers in Albania
Expatriate footballers in Malta
Ghanaian expatriate sportspeople in Spain
Ghanaian expatriate sportspeople in Lithuania
Ghanaian expatriate sportspeople in Germany
Ghanaian expatriate sportspeople in Albania